Ancistrotus aduncus is a species of beetle in the family Cerambycidae. It is endemic to Brazil, specifically southeast Espírito Santo, Rio de Janeiro and Minas Gerais.

References 

Prioninae